WPGM (1570 AM) is a radio station broadcasting a religious format. Licensed to Danville, Pennsylvania, United States, the station is currently owned by Montrose Broadcasting Corporation.

References

External links
 

Montour County, Pennsylvania
PGM
Radio stations established in 1963
1963 establishments in Pennsylvania